HMS Powerful was the lead ship of her class of two protected cruisers built for the Royal Navy (RN) in the 1890s. She was initially assigned to the China Station and then provided landing parties which fought in the Siege of Ladysmith of 1899–1900 during the Second Boer War. After a lengthy refit, the ship was placed in reserve until 1905 when Powerful became the flagship of the Australia Station. Upon her return home in 1912, she was again reduced to reserve for a brief time before she was reclassified as a training ship. The ship remained in this role until 1929 when she was sold for scrap.

Design and description
The Powerful-class cruiser was designed to counter the Russian armoured cruiser  which had been designed as a long-range commerce raider. This required long range and high speed to catch the Russian ship. The ships displaced  at normal load. The ships were powered by a pair of four-cylinder triple-expansion steam engines, each driving one propeller shaft, using steam provided by 48 Belleville boilers.

The main armament of the Powerful-class cruisers consisted of two  Mk VIII guns in single gun turrets, one each fore and aft of the superstructure. Her secondary armament of a dozen  Mk I or II guns was arranged in casemates amidships. The end casemates were the first two-storey (guns on the main and upper decks) casemates in the RN. For defence against torpedo boats, sixteen 12-pounder  12-cwt guns and a dozen 3-pounder Hotchkiss guns were fitted. Two additional 12-pounder 8-cwt guns could be dismounted for service ashore. The ships also mounted four submerged 18-inch (450 mm) torpedo tubes, a pair on each broadside.

With the exception of the barbettes, which used mild steel, all of the protective plating of the cruisers was Harvey armour. The armour of the gun turrets, their barbettes and the casemates was 6 inches thick. The casemates had  backs.

Construction and career
Powerful was laid down by Vickers Limited in their Barrow-in-Furness shipyard on 10 March 1894 and launched on 24 July 1895 by the Louisa Cavendish, Duchess of Devonshire. The ship was commissioned on 8 June 1897 with Captain the Hon. Hedworth Lambton in command, for service on the China Station. Her departure was delayed so that she could participate in the fleet review commemorating Queen Victoria's Diamond Jubilee on 26 June and the annual fleet manoeuvres in July. During a full-power run between Wei Hai Wai, China, and Yokohama, Japan, in late July 1898, her stokers mutinied, but she then visited Port Arthur without incident.

Ordered home in 1899, Powerful was diverted from the shorter route through the Suez Canal to round the southern tip of Africa in light of rising tensions between the British and the Boers in South Africa. The ship departed Hong Kong, China, on 17 September and arrived at Simonstown on 13 October, two days after the Second Boer War began; Lambton having picked up a half-battalion of the King's Own Yorkshire Light Infantry from the island of Mauritius on his own initiative. Her sister ship, commanded by Captain Percy Scott, arrived the following day and Scott improvised field carriages for a pair of 4.7-inch (120 mm) and a pair of Terribles 12-pounder guns. After a request from Lieutenant General George White, commander of the besieged forces at Ladysmith for more long-range artillery, Powerful ferried all four guns to Durban, reaching it on 29 November. Lambton acquired another pair of 12-pounders and led a naval brigade that reached Ladysmith on the last two trains to make it through. After the Relief of Ladysmith at the end of February, the brigade departed the town on 7 March and arrived at Simontown on the 12th. Powerful left Simonstown three days later and arrived at Portsmouth on 11 April.

The enthusiastic response in Britain to the "heroes of Ladysmith" was enormous and made Lambton a well-known public figure. Queen Victoria sent a telegram saying, "Pray express to the Naval Brigade my deep appreciation of the valuable services they have rendered with their guns." while a reception and celebratory march through London were among the first events ever recorded on film.

A newspaper described Powerful's return home:

The naval brigade paraded for Queen Victoria at Windsor Castle on 2 May. The RN field gun competition commemorates the participation of Terrible and Powerful in the relief of Ladysmith. In 1921 a new Primary School in Ladysmith was named after Lieutenant Frederick Greville Egerton, a gunnery officer from Powerful who was killed at Ladysmith.

Later career
Powerful paid off on 8 June 1900 at Portsmouth Dockyard and later began a long refit in 1902–1903 During this refit, the RN added four six-inch guns in casemates amidships, although no additional ammunition could be accommodated in the ship. The ship was briefly commissioned in August 1903 to participate in the annual fleet manoeuvres and was assigned to the reserve on 1 March 1905. In August Captain Lionel Halsey took command of Powerful, 
as flag captain to Sir Wilmot Fawkes as Commander-in-Chief Australia Station. At the time Powerful was commissioning as flagship on the Australia Station. Halsey remained in that post until 1908.

At the beginning of December 1905, Powerful was at Fremantle in Western Australia. On 10 October 1907 the ship took aboard a new crew in Colombo, Ceylon. On 3 February 1908 the first trans-Tasman radio transmission was made via Powerful which was in the Tasman Sea. A Sydney Morning Herald journalist, Charles Bean, joined the ship in August 1908 as a special correspondent to report the visit of sixteen American warships – the Great White Fleet. Bean wrote a book, With the Flagship in the South (London, 1909), based on his reports and had it published at his own expense. Powerful took aboard a new crew in Colombo on 12 January 1910. In 1911 Powerful visited Auckland, New Zealand to inspect the facilities and Captain Edward Bruen recommended the setting up of a naval stores facility.

The ship was ordered home in January 1912 and loaded the body of Alexander Duff, 1st Duke of Fife at Port Said, Egypt, on 9 March en route. After arriving, she was briefly assigned to the 7th Cruiser Squadron of the Third (Reserve) Fleet before she was reclassified as a Boys Training Ship at Devonport in August 1912. Powerful was assigned as a tender to HMS Impregnable in 1913. She was reassigned to a training role on 23 September and was renamed Impregnable I in November 1919. The ship was paid off on 27 March 1929 and was sold in August 1929 for breaking up.

Notes

Citations

References

Further reading

External links

HMS Powerful on the Dreadnought Project

 

Powerful-class cruisers
Ships built in Barrow-in-Furness
1895 ships
World War I cruisers of the United Kingdom
Second Boer War